The 2018–19 season was the 120th season of the English Football League (EFL) and the third season under that name after it was renamed from The Football League in 2016. It began on 3 August 2018 and concluded on 5 May 2019, with the promotion play-off finals at Wembley Stadium on 25–27 May 2019. For the sixth season running, the league was sponsored by Sky Betting & Gaming and was therefore known as the Sky Bet EFL.

The EFL is contested through three divisions: the Championship, League One and League Two. The winner and the runner up of the Championship are automatically promoted to the Premier League and they are joined by the winner of the Championship playoff. The bottom two teams in League Two are relegated to the National League.

The 2018–19 season marked the start of an initial two-year partnership between the EFL and its official charity partner Mind. The mental health charity had its logo displayed on the shirts of all EFL clubs and worked with the EFL to promote mental health within football and the wider community. Also, this season saw one of the EFL's original members, Notts County, relegated from the league for the first time ever.

Promotion and relegation

From the Premier League
 Relegated to the Championship
West Bromwich Albion
Stoke City
Swansea City

From the Championship
 Promoted to the Premier League
Wolverhampton Wanderers
Cardiff City
Fulham
 Relegated to League One
Barnsley
Burton Albion
Sunderland

From League One
 Promoted to the Championship
Wigan Athletic
Blackburn Rovers
Rotherham United
 Relegated to League Two
Oldham Athletic
Northampton Town
MK Dons
Bury

From League Two
 Promoted to League One
Accrington Stanley
Luton Town
Wycombe Wanderers
Coventry City
 Relegated to the National League
Barnet
Chesterfield

From the National League
 Promoted to League Two
Macclesfield Town
Tranmere Rovers

Championship

Table

Play-offs

Results

League One

Table

Play-offs

Results

League Two

Table

Play-offs

Results

Managerial changes

References

 
2018-19